is an upcoming Japanese anime television series, based on the manga series of the same title by Nobuhiro Watsuki. It is the second anime television series adaptation, after the 1996–98 series. It will be directed by Hideyo Yamamoto and animated by Liden Films and is set to premiere in 2023 on Fuji TV's Noitamina programming block.

Voice cast

Production and broadcast
On December 19, 2021, at the Jump Festa '22 event, it was announced that a new television series adaptation of the Rurouni Kenshin manga would be animated by Liden Films. A promotional video was shown at the Aniplex Online Fest 2022 on September 24, 2022. The series will re-adapt the original manga series. It will be directed by Hideyo Yamamoto, with scripts written by Hideyuki Kurata, character designs by Terumi Nishii, and music composed by Yū Takami. The original manga author, Nobuhiro Watsuki, supervised the character designs and scenario. Soma Saito and Rie Takahashi will star as Himura Kenshin and Kamiya Kaoru, respectively, replacing both Mayo Suzukaze and Miki Fujitani, who previously voiced the characters in the 1996–98 series and later original video animation adaptations. The series is set to premiere in 2023 on Fuji TV's Noitamina programming block.

Notes

References

External links
  
 

Rurouni Kenshin
2023 anime television series debuts
Anime series based on manga
Aniplex
Fiction set in 1878
Liden Films
Meiji period in fiction
Noitamina
Samurai in anime and manga
Upcoming anime television series
Works about atonement